The Mang'anja are a Bantu people of central and southern Africa, particularly around Chikwawa in the Shire River valley of southern Malawi. They speak a dialect of the Nyanja language, and are a branch of the Amaravi people. As of 1996 their population was estimated at 2,486,070.

Notable Mang'anja people 

Edward Bwanali
Yusuf Jonas Msume
Moses Dosi
Sidick Mia
Davis Kapito
Evison Matafale
(Peter Mpota)
Gwanda Chakuamba

References

External links

Chewa
Bantu peoples
Ethnic groups in Malawi